Pedro Luis Ascoy Cortez (born August 10, 1980 in Guadalupe, Peru) is a Peruvian footballer who plays as a winger for León de Huánuco.

Club career
Ascoy made his Peruvian First Division debut in the 1998 season with Peruvian giants Alianza Lima. He also scored his first goal in the First Division in the 1999 season while wearing Alianza Lima colors.

Honours

Club 
Juan Aurich
 Peruvian First Division (1): 2011

References

External links

1980 births
Living people
People from Pacasmayo Province
Association football wingers
Peruvian footballers
Peruvian expatriate footballers
Peru international footballers
Peruvian Primera División players
Club Alianza Lima footballers
C.D. Universidad Privada Antenor Orrego footballers
Unión Minas footballers
Juan Aurich footballers
Sport Coopsol Trujillo footballers
Cienciano footballers
Estudiantes de Medicina footballers
Alianza Atlético footballers
Club Deportivo Universidad César Vallejo footballers
Sport Áncash footballers
Manta F.C. footballers
León de Huánuco footballers
Expatriate footballers in Ecuador